The 2022–23 Kaohsiung Aquas season was the franchise's 2nd season, its second season in the T1 League, its 2nd in Kaohsiung City. The Aquas are coached by Brendan Joyce in his second year as head coach.

Draft 

 Reference：

The Aquas acquired 2022 first-round draft pick from New Taipei CTBC DEA in exchange for cash considerations. On August 4, 2022, the first rounder, Pai Yao-Cheng had joined Taoyuan Pilots of the P. League+.

Standings

Roster 

<noinclude>

Game log

Preseason

Regular season

Regular season note 
 Due to the Taichung Suns cannot reach the minimum player number, the T1 League declared that the game on January 14 would postpone.

Player Statistics 
<noinclude>

Regular season

 Reference：

Transactions

Free agents

Re-signed

Additions

Subtractions

Awards

References 

2022–23 T1 League season by team
Kaohsiung Aquas seasons